Shaheen Group of Institutions is a group of educational institutions set up by Abdul Qadeer, in Bidar, Karnataka. The group includes several schools, PU colleges and graduation colleges in 13 states all over India. It also provides coaching for NEET&JEE Mains,JEE advanced,UPSC etc and it's NEET aspirants have been successful to get admission in various prominent medical colleges including AIIMS delhi as well.

History
Shaheen Group of Institutions was started by Abdul Qadeer, a civil engineer, in 1989 in Bidar, Karnataka. He was in search of a proper education institute for his younger brother when he didn't find any school as per his expectations he started a school with just 17 students in Bidar.

Campus
Shaheen has three campuses in the Bidar city having multiple schools and colleges with a resident capacity of 3500 students. It has separate boys and girls campuses where around 16000 students from 23 different states of India are studying.

Branches
Shaheen group of Institutions has around 45 branches in 12 states of India namely Karnataka, Telangana, Maharashtra, Adnhra Pradesh, Kerala, Delhi, Gujarat, Madhya Pradesh, Jharkhand, Bihar, Assam and Uttar Pradesh.

References

Education in Karnataka